An electronic grade book is a teacher's online record of their students' lessons, assignments, progress and grades.  An electronic grade book interfaces with a student information system which houses a school district's student records including grades, attendance medical records, transcripts, student schedules and other data.  Some electronic grade books make grades, homework and student schedules available online to parents and students.

Some examples of services that provide grade books are TAMO, Gradealyzer, Spiral Universe, QuickSchools.com, and GPA Teacher. All these provide an easy way to update grade book information about each student as well as the ability to quickly and easily transfer this information into the end-of-term report cards.

In 2010 the British Government agency for ICT in education, BECTA, put in place a requirement for report cards for all pupils in the comprehensive school system to have their reports made available to parents online.

See also
GlobalScholar
report card

References

School-administration software